Roberts Branch is a stream in Morgan County in the U.S. state of Missouri. It is a tributary of Osage River.

Roberts Branch has the name of the original owner of the site.

See also
List of rivers of Missouri

References

Rivers of Morgan County, Missouri
Rivers of Missouri